Edial is a hamlet to the east of Burntwood in Staffordshire, England. For population details taken at the 2011 census see Burntwood.

Edial Hall School, Edial, is celebrated as the house in which lexicographer, Samuel Johnson, opened an academy in 1736, where he taught and commenced writing the tragedy Irene.

Edial House is a Grade II listed house dating from about 1740.

References

Villages in Staffordshire